The Historic Old Central High School of Duluth, Minnesota, United States, is a local landmark dating to 1892.  One of Minnesota's leading examples of Richardsonian Romanesque architecture, it occupies an entire city block and sports a  clock tower.  It was listed on the National Register of Historic Places as Duluth Central High School in 1972 for its state-level significance in the theme of architecture.

Description
The Historic Old Central High School is a massive, three-story building of Lake Superior Brownstone. Its footprint is an inverted "T" shape. The clock tower is centrally placed, with the main entrance through a massive arch at its base. Two small turrets flank the clock tower. The entrance arches are echoed by arched window openings on the second floor, the dormers, and the around the clock faces.

The interior originally contained 11 classrooms on the ground floor and 10 on the second floor, a library with a large fireplace, offices, and a two-story auditorium.  Large double staircases of slate and iron led to the upper floors.  The third floor contained laboratories, shop classrooms, a gymnasium, a music room, and a teaching museum.  Much of the interior has been altered over the years due to changing needs and safety standards.  A wing containing an updated gymnasium and chemistry classrooms was later added to the north.

History
The Historic Old Central High School was designed by the prominent East Coast architectural firm of Palmer, Hall, & Hunt, with local assistance from Duluth-based architects Oliver G. Traphagen and Francis W. Fitzpatrick.  The cornerstone was laid in 1891 at a ceremony attended by roughly 7,000 people.  The clock was manufactured by E. Howard & Co. of Boston and installed in 1893.  Two years later, five bells, cast by the Buckeye Bell Foundry of Cincinnati, Ohio, were added to the clock to chime the Westminster Quarters.  From 1898 to 1942 a  cannon stood on the high school's steps, a prize captured from the Spanish warship Oquendo during the Spanish–American War.  As America entered World War II the cannon was donated to a scrap metal drive and melted down.

Recent use
Upon the completion of a new Central High School in 1971, Duluth Public Schools ceased using the old high school building for classroom instruction.  The Central Preservation Committee and other interested citizens worked to save it from demolition.  It was officially renamed the Historic Old Central High School on October 19, 2004.

Today the Old Central High School houses offices for the school district, Education Equity, Indian Education, and the St. Louis County Soil & Water District.  It also contains an 1890s classroom museum.  Instruction has resumed in the building via community education and Unity High School alternative education programs.

See also
 National Register of Historic Places listings in St. Louis County, Minnesota

References

External links

 Historic Old Central High School

1892 establishments in Minnesota
Buildings and structures in Duluth, Minnesota
Clock towers in Minnesota
Defunct schools in Minnesota
High schools in Duluth, Minnesota
National Register of Historic Places in St. Louis County, Minnesota
Richardsonian Romanesque architecture in Minnesota
School buildings completed in 1892
School buildings on the National Register of Historic Places in Minnesota
Duluth, Minnesota